The 1942 Santa Clara Broncos football team was an American football team that represented Santa Clara University as an independent during the 1942 college football season. In their seventh season under head coach Buck Shaw, the Broncos compiled a 7–2 record, outscored opponents by a total of 101 to 52, and were ranked No. 15 in the final AP Poll.

After winning its first four games against Utah, Stanford, California, and Oregon State, Santa Clara was ranked No. 9 in the AP Poll. The team lost to No. 14 UCLA, then rebounded with three consecutive victories, including victories over rivals San Francisco and Saint Mary's. In the final game of the season, the Broncos lost to the powerful service team assembled at Saint Mary's Preflight School.

Schedule

Postseason
Two Santa Clara players were recognized on the 1942 College Football All-America Team: end Al Beals received second-team honors from the Central Press Association; and quarterback Jesse Freitas received third-team honors from the Associated Press.

In March 1943, coach Shaw cancelled spring football practice.  At that point, 98% of the school's male students were in the Reserve Officers' Training Corps, and their free time was occupied by Army training. Shaw noted that "fall football looks hopeless," and added that it was "improbable that we could get a football team from among the 4-F boys or those under 18."

On August 18, 1943, the school announced that it was abandoning football for the duration of World War II. Athletic director George Barsi noted that 94% of the prior year's student body was in the armed services, and the shortage of manpower made it "inadvisable to field a team". The Broncos did not field a football team again until 1946.

References

Santa Clara
Santa Clara Broncos football seasons
Santa Clara Broncos football